Elections in Kerala are regularly held to fill government officials at all levels of government in both Kerala and India as a whole. These range from national elections to regional local body or panchayat elections.

The Assembly of Kerala can create laws regarding the conduct of local body elections unilaterally while any changes by the state legislature to the conduct of state level elections need to be approved by the Parliament of India. In addition, the state legislature may be dismissed by the Parliament according to Article 356 of the Indian Constitution and President's rule may be imposed.

State Election Commission prepares the electoral rolls of Panchayats, Municipalities and Municipal Corporation and conduct their elections. The State Election Commissioner is also the Chairman of the Delimitation Commission.

State Legislative Assembly Elections 

State-level elections are held to fill the Kerala Legislative Assembly. The latest Assembly elections were held on 6 April 2021.

Lok Sabha elections

Local Self Government institutions 

Panchayat Elections is a term widely used in Kerala, India, for the polls that are held to select the Local Self-government Representatives. There are three branches of local self-government institutions in Kerala. They are Grama Panchayat which can be translated as Village Government, Block Panchayat and District Panchayat. A Grama Panchayat is almost an equivalent to City administration and District Panchayat to a County. There are two more wings namely Municipality which is another form of Block Panchayat that exists only in major towns and Corporations that come only in six major cities. Consequent to the 73rd Amendment to the Constitution of India, the local self-government institutions (LSGIs) are to function as the third tier of government.

At present, there are 1200 local governments in Kerala, which includes 941 Grama Panchayats, 152 Block Panchayats, 14 District Panchayats, 77 Taluks, 87 Municipalities and 6 Municipal Corporations.

The last Election to the Local Self-government Institutions in Kerala (Panchayat Elections) was held in 2020 december. The results were announced on 16 december 2020. Next local body elections are scheduled to be held in 2025.

See also
 2015 Kerala local body elections
 2016 Kerala Legislative Assembly election

Notes

External links
Election Commission of India

LSGI Election Result 2010
LSGI Election Result 2005
Kerala State Election Commission
Chief Electoral Officer, Kerala